Alchesay may refer to:

William Alchesay, a White Mountain Apache Indian chief
Alchesay Flat, a geographic feature on the Fort Apache Indian Reservation in Navajo County, Arizona
Alchesay High School, a public high school on the Fort Apache Indian Reservation in Navajo County, Arizona